Thottakattu Govinda Menon (29 August 1823) was an Indian civil servant and administrator who served as the Diwan of Cochin kingdom from 1879 to 1890. He was the younger brother of T. Sankunni Menon. It was during his tenure that the border between Cochin and Travancore kingdoms was settled.

References 

Diwans of Cochin
19th-century Indian people